William Bate may refer to:

William Bates (Quaker) (died 1700), or Bate, founder of Newton Colony, the third English settlement in West New Jersey
William Thornton Bate (1818–1857), British naval officer
William B. Bate (1826–1905), American soldier and politician
William Bate Hardy (1864–1934), British biologist and Fellow of the Royal Society
William J. Bate (1934–2011), New Jersey politician and judge

See also
William Bates (disambiguation)